"Save Me, San Francisco" is a song by the American pop rock band Train. It was released on April 25, 2011, as the fifth and final single from their fifth studio album of the same name. The song was written by Dave Katz, Sam Hollander, and Pat Monahan and produced by Martin Terefe.

Music video
A music video to accompany the release of "Save Me, San Francisco" was first released onto YouTube on April 29, 2011, at a total length of four minutes and 17 seconds.

The plot of the music video is an allusion to 1967 California classic The Graduate. Like in the film, the male protagonist (played by Pat) is uninvited and late to the wedding of his beloved girl, Elaine. He travels across San Francisco in his sports car to reach the wedding, but runs out of gas, and ends up sprinting the rest of the way. Pat bursts into the church and shouts out his objection — only to find that Elaine is marrying a lesbian. He is consoled by a wedding guest on the church steps as the newlyweds drive away. The video also features footage of a March 2011 Train concert in Oakland, CA

Much of the video was shot on Treasure Island in the San Francisco Bay. The church is at 51 California Ave. on the island.

Chart performance

Weekly charts

Year-end charts

Certifications

Release history

References

2011 singles
Train (band) songs
Songs about San Francisco
Songs written by Sam Hollander
Songs written by Dave Katz
Songs written by Pat Monahan
Torch songs

2009 songs